Immigration Restriction Act may refer to:
Immigration Restriction Act 1901 in Australia
Immigration Restriction Act of 1924 (also known as the National Origins Act or the Johnston–Reed Act) in the United States
Immigration Restriction Act 1935 in New Zealand